Mateusz Konrad Musialowski (born 16 October 2003) is a Polish professional footballer who plays as a midfielder or forward for Liverpool. He also scored what is considered to be one of the best under - 18s Premier league goals against Newcastle United. He is also known as  Polish Messi.

Early life
Born in Katowice, Poland, Musialowski started his career at Ajaks Częstochowa at the age of five. Four years later, he joined the academy of top flight Raków Częstochowa, before spending time on loan with Skra Częstochowa. Following his loan spell, Musialowski joined SMS Łódź, where he would go on to score 133 goals in 88 games at youth level.

Club career
After trials with Premier League side Arsenal, Musialowski joined rivals Liverpool in August 2020. He signed his first professional contract in July 2021, and has trained with Liverpool's first team.

In July 2022, he made his unofficial Liverpool debut, coming on as a substitute in a 3-0 friendly defeat to Strasbourg.

International career
Musialowski has represented Poland at numerous youth levels.

Style of play
Comfortable playing in midfield, or further forward on either wing, Musialowski has been compared to footballing legend Lionel Messi, earning the nickname "the Polish Messi". Musialowski himself has stated that he models his style of play on the Argentine's, and notably scored a Messi-esque goal against Newcastle United's under-18s in March 2021; a goal which was later named the under-18 Premier League goal of the season. He has also been compared to Real Madrid superstar Eden Hazard for his dribbling ability.

Career statistics
.

References

2003 births
Living people
Sportspeople from Katowice
Polish footballers
Poland youth international footballers
Poland under-21 international footballers
Association football midfielders
Association football forwards
Raków Częstochowa players
Skra Częstochowa players
UKS SMS Łódź players
Liverpool F.C. players
Polish expatriate footballers
Polish expatriate sportspeople in England
Expatriate footballers in England